Fab Five may refer to:

Media
 FAB 5, Greek reality TV show
 The Fab Five (film), a 2011 ESPN Films documentary about the 1990s Michigan Wolverines men's basketball players
 Fab Five: The Texas Cheerleader Scandal, a 2008 American teen drama telefilm produced by Lifetime

People
Music
 Fab Five, a nickname of Duran Duran, an English new wave band formed in Birmingham in 1978
 Fab Five Freddy (born 1959), American visual artist, filmmaker, and hip hop pioneer
Sports
 Fab Five (University of Michigan), the 1991 University of Michigan men's basketball team recruiting class
 Fab Five, later also known as the Fierce Five, the United States' artistic gymnastics team at the 2012 Summer Olympics
Television
 Fab Five, the hosts of the American reality television series Queer Eye

See also
 Fab Four (disambiguation)
 Fabulous Five (disambiguation)
 The Famous Five (disambiguation)